Gilbert Hashan (born 12 January 1970) is a Mauritian Olympic middle-distance runner and hurdler. He represented his country in the men's 400 metres hurdles at the 1996 Summer Olympics, as well as in the men's 4 × 400 metres relay. His time was a 49.94 in the hurdles, and his team's time was a 3:08.17 in the relay.

References

External links
 

1970 births
Living people
Mauritian male hurdlers
Olympic athletes of Mauritius
Athletes (track and field) at the 1996 Summer Olympics
Commonwealth Games competitors for Mauritius
Athletes (track and field) at the 1994 Commonwealth Games